Mad Libs is an American children's game show based on the book/word game series. It aired on the Disney Channel from July 26, 1998 to mid-1999 (with a "special pilot" that aired in February 1997), and was hosted by David Sidoni. Dick Clark and J. D. Roth produced the show.

Gameplay
Mad Libs pitted two teams of two kids (one red and the other blue), in a series of physical/mental-related challenges that pertain to the formula of the Mad Libs books, while trying to score points and win prizes.

The Main Game

Round 1 ("Viewer Mad Lib")
In round one, a home viewer recited a Mad Lib that he/she wrote beforehand. That Mad Lib became a physical game, where the object was to make the most progress within a time limit of 45 seconds or to be the first team to complete the stunt. The team who won the stunt got 20 points. If both teams won the stunt, they both got 20 points.

Round 2 ("Madder Than You")

In this round, a category was given by host Sidoni. The contestants would come up with a series of words that would fit the category, working back and forth while passing and controlling a white ball (referred to on the show as the "hot potato"). The process continued until one team gave a word that did not fit the category, repeated a word (including a different form of the same word), passed the hot potato before answering, or ran out of time.

When one of those violations occurred, the other team received five points, after which another category was played in the same manner. The round was played for two minutes.

Round 3 ("Mega Stunt")
Both teams competed in a stunt, consisting of anything from picking nose hairs to grabbing mohawks while being strapped to a mailbag, to grab items needed to create a Mad Lib. Each item in the stunt had a word on it, and the object of the stunt was to get four words in four categories. Doing so completed the Mad Lib and earned 20 points.

Round 4 ("Mixed-Up Mad Libs")
In this deciding round, the host read a series of statements that had a crazy word inserted in each one. The contestants buzzed in to correct those statements with the right word. If the buzz-in contestant gave an incorrect answer, the opposing team got a chance to answer. After each statement, the contestants at the buzzers switched places with his/her partner. Each correct answer was worth ten points. The round was played for 90 seconds, and the team with the most points when time ran out won the game. If there was a tie at the end of the round, one last Mixed-Up Mad Lib was read, and the first player to buzz-in and correct the statement won; otherwise his/her opponents automatically won. The winning team went on to the bonus round while the losing team went home with parting gifts.

Bonus Round ("Maximum Mad Lib")
In this bonus round, the team decided who would give and who would receive. The giving player during the last commercial break placed five words (given to that player via envelope) anywhere in the five clue areas. After the break, the giver was given 90 seconds to get his/her partner to say those words. Sidoni gave the category to each word.

The clue areas varied each episode, and the actions involved the giving player performing an unusual event, such as stuffing marshmallows in his/her mouth and saying the word, licking frosting and spelling the word with their tongue, or acting out the word without speaking.

Each time the receiver said a word, the team won that word. They could pass on a word and return to it if time permitted. When time ran out, the words were inserted into the Mad Lib. After it was read, the identified words were checked one at a time. One of the five words was dubbed the grand prize word and if the team solved that word, or if they solved all five words before time expired, they won the grand prize. If not, they received a consolation prize.

See also
 Mad Libs

References

External links
 Mad Libs on IMDb

Disney Channel original programming
Television series by Dick Clark Productions
Television series by Disney
1990s American children's game shows
1998 American television series debuts
1999 American television series endings
Television shows based on books
English-language television shows